Oliver Bundgaard Kristensen (born 15 June 2001) is a Danish professional footballer who plays as a left-back for Danish Superliga club Viborg FF.

Club career
A product of the Randers FC youth academy, Bundgaard made his first team debut on 30 October 2019 in the 2–0 win over Viby IF in the Danish Cup. He made his debut in the domestic league on 7 June 2020, coming on as a substitute in the 83rd minute for Johnny Thomsen in a 2–1 loss to FC Copenhagen.

On 31 May 2021, he extended his contract with Randers until 2024. Upon signing the extension, sporting director Søren Pedersen stated that "[i]t's so great to be able to extend the deal with one of our own guys, who during the spring showed that he can play at the highest level in Denmark".

On 27 October 2021, Bundgaard scored his first professional goal in a 4–0 win in the Danish Cup over Middelfart Boldklub, a strike from inside the penalty ark after an assist by Vincent Onovo.

On 31 August 2022, Bundgaard joined fellow league club Viborg FF on a deal until June 2026.

International career
On 5 June 2021, Bundgaard made his Denmark U20 debut during a 1–0 win over Republic of Ireland in a friendly in Marbella, Spain.

Career statistics

Club

Honours
Randers
Danish Cup: 2020–21

References

External links

2001 births
Living people
People from Randers
Danish men's footballers
Denmark youth international footballers
Association football midfielders
Association football fullbacks
Danish Superliga players
Randers FC players
Viborg FF players
Sportspeople from the Central Denmark Region